Savino is a rural locality (a village) in Malyshevskoye Rural Settlement, Selivanovsky District, Vladimir Oblast, Russia. The population was 19 as of 2010.

Geography 
Savino is located 20 km south of Krasnaya Gorbatka (the district's administrative centre) by road. Fedorkovo is the nearest rural locality.

References 

Rural localities in Selivanovsky District